Vittorio Messori (born 1941) is an Italian journalist and writer. According to Sandro Magister, a Vaticanist, he is the "most translated Catholic writer in the world."

Life

Messori had a completely secular upbringing. He was warned against priests by his mother, who often said that the Church was "only a pub." The schools he attended imparted an equally secular culture, and when he enrolled in the faculty of political science at Turin, all the teachers there taught "a radical, impenetrable agnosticism." He was "happy" with this, and "was preparing for a career as an entirely secular intellectual."

In July and August 1964, however, he unexpectedly entered a new kind of dimension. In his own words, "the truth of the Gospel, that until then was unknown to me, became very clear and tangible. Even though I had never attended Church, even though I had never studied religion, I found that my perspective as a secularist and agnostic had become suddenly Christian. What's more, Catholic."

Messori's teachers were "very surprised and disappointed" when he confessed that he had become a Catholic. They regarded his conversion as "a psychiatric crisis, a depression, a mistake," with the result that, as Messori says, "they abandoned me and finally disowned me."

See also

References

External links
Home page of Vittorio Messori – in Italian.
Vittorio Messori review of Mel Gibson's "The Passion of the Christ"
Interview with Messori about anti-catholic provocations (pdf), in Il Giornale, 23 June 2007

1941 births
Converts to Roman Catholicism from atheism or agnosticism
Investigative journalists
Italian newspaper editors
Italian male journalists
Italian Roman Catholics
Living people
Roman Catholic writers